The following is a list of notable deaths in March 2010.

Entries for each day are listed alphabetically by surname. A typical entry lists information in the following sequence:
 Name, age, country of citizenship at birth, subsequent country of citizenship (if applicable), reason for notability, cause of death (if known), and reference.

March 2010

1
Tadur Bala Goud, 78, Indian politician.
Mary Barr, 84, first female aviator in the US Forest Service.
Perry Brooks, 55, American football player (Washington Redskins).
Robert Clarkson, 62, American tax protestor.
Kristian Digby, 32, British television presenter and director (To Buy or Not to Buy), accidental suffocation.
Clifton Forbes, 64, Jamaican Olympic athlete.
Emil Forselius, 35, Swedish actor, suicide.
Slavko Fras, 81, Slovenian journalist and editor.
Barry Hannah, 67, American novelist and short story writer, heart attack.
Vladimir Ilyushin, 82, Russian test pilot.
*Paul Kim Ok-kyun, 84, South Korean Roman Catholic prelate, Titular Bishop of Girba (1985–2001).
Ruth Kligman, 80, American abstract painter, muse of Jackson Pollock.

2
Francisco Ada, 75, Northern Mariana Islands politician, first Lieutenant Governor (1978–1982).
Syed Ali, 67, Indian Olympic gold medal-winning (1964) field hockey player.
Alexander Tikhomirov, 28, Russian/Islamist militant leader, ideologue leader of the Islamist rebels, killed by Russian troops.
Melva Blancett, 85, American actress.
Judith Bumpus, 70, British arts radio producer.
Winston Churchill, 69, British politician, MP for Stretford (1970–1983) and Davyhulme (1983–1997), prostate cancer.
Paul Drayton, 70, American athlete, 1964 Olympic gold and silver medalist, cancer.
Jón Hnefill Aðalsteinsson, 82, Icelandic scholar.
Don Kent, 92, American meteorologist (WBZ-TV), natural causes.
Miloslav Loos, 96, Czech Olympic cyclist.
Ibragim Khasanov, 72, Russian Olympic sprint canoer.
Charles B. Moore, 89, American physicist, engineer and meteorologist.
Eric Morse, 91, Australian cricketer.
Geoff Myburgh, 81, South African Olympic sailor.
Joseph Hernández Ochoa, 26, Honduran journalist, shot.
Omar Pound, 83, American writer and translator.
Horst Urban, 73, Czech Olympic luger.

3
Keith Alexander, 53, British footballer (Saint Lucia) and manager, brain aneurysm.
Johnny Allen, 76, American football player (Washington Redskins), Alzheimer's disease.
Stefan Bengtsson, 55, Swedish Olympic sailor.
Frank Bertaina, 65, American Major League Baseball player, heart attack.
Mariya Dolina, 87, Ukrainian dive bomber pilot, Hero of the Soviet Union.
Franz Eibler, 85, Austrian Olympic weightlifter.
Michael Foot, 96, British politician, Leader of the Labour Party (1980–1983).
Marie-Christine Gessinger, 17, Austrian fashion model, car accident.
Momo Kapor, 72, Serbian writer and painter.
Big Tiny Little, 79, American musician (The Lawrence Welk Show).
Yuri Stepanov, 42, Russian actor, car accident.
John Strohmeyer, 85, American journalist, Pulitzer Prize winner, heart failure.
Oleg Tyurin, 72, Russian rower, 1964 Olympic gold medalist.

4
Raimund Abraham, 76, Austrian-born American architect (Austrian Cultural Forum New York), car accident.
Johnny Alf, 80, Brazilian singer and composer, prostate cancer.
Vladislav Ardzinba, 64, Georgian politician, separatist President of Abkhazia (1994–2005).
Big Truck, c. 5, American Thoroughbred racehorse, euthanized.
André Bouchard, 64, Canadian ecologist and environmentalist, heart attack.
Etta Cameron, 70, Bahamian-born Danish gospel singer, cancer.
*Hilario Chávez Joya, 82, Mexican Roman Catholic prelate, Bishop of Nuevo Casas Grandes (1977–2004).
Amalie Christie, 96, Norwegian pianist.
Samuel J. Eldersveld, 92, American political scientist and politician.
Joaquim Fiúza, 102, Portuguese sailor, 1952 Olympic bronze medalist.
Tetsuo Kondo, 80, Japanese politician, Minister of Labour (1991–1992).
Nan Martin, 82, American actress (The Drew Carey Show, Cast Away, Shallow Hal), emphysema.
Roger Newman, 69, British-born American actor and television writer (Guiding Light, Passions), cancer.
Angelo Poffo, 84, American professional wrestler.
Tony Richards, 76, English footballer (Walsall).
Joanne Simpson, 86, American meteorologist, first woman to earn a doctorate in meteorology.
Lolly Vegas, 70, American singer (Redbone), lung cancer.
Fred Wedlock, 67, British folk musician, complications from pneumonia.

5
Obaidullah Akhund, Afghan Taliban leader, heart disease.
Aminah Assilmi, c. 65, American Muslim lecturer, writer and women's rights activist, car accident.
Donald N. Frey, 87, American product planning manager, co-creator of Ford Mustang, stroke.
Aleksandr Grave, 89, Russian actor.
Herta Haas, 96, Slovenian-born Yugoslav Partisan, second wife of Josip Broz Tito.
Philip Langridge, 70, British tenor, colorectal cancer.
Andrée Peel, 105, French patriot, World War II Resistance member.
Charles B. Pierce, 71, American film director (The Legend of Boggy Creek).
Alberto Ronchey, 83, Italian politician and journalist.
Wolfgang Schenck, 97, German airman, Luftwaffe flying ace.
Richard Stapley, 86, British-born American actor (The Three Musketeers), renal failure.
Hal Trumble, 83, American ice hockey administrator and referee.
Edgar Wayburn, 103, American environmentalist and conservationist.
Jan Wilson, 70, Australian politician, Victorian MLA for Dandenong North (1985–1999).

6
Mansour Amirasefi, 76, Iranian Olympic footballer, cancer.
*Cho Gyeong-chul, 80, South Korean astronomer, heart attack.
Fiennes Cornwallis, 3rd Baron Cornwallis, 88, British aristocrat.
Bruce Graham, 84, American architect (Willis Tower, John Hancock Center), Alzheimer's disease.
Endurance Idahor, 25, Nigerian footballer, heart attack.
H.M. Koutoukas, 72, American playwright (Medea in the Laundromat), complications of diabetes.
Mark Linkous, 47, American singer-songwriter (Sparklehorse), suicide by gunshot.
Carol Marsh, 83, British actress.
Ifedayo Oladapo, 77, Nigerian engineer.
Ronald Pettersson, 74, Swedish ice hockey player.
Jim Roland, 67, American Major League Baseball player.
Syd Tierney, 86, British politician, MP for Birmingham Yardley (1974–1979).
Nigel Trench, 7th Baron Ashtown, 93, British diplomat.

7
Sir Kenneth Dover, 89, British classicist, President of the British Academy (1978–1981).
Ken Dyer, 63, American football player (Cincinnati Bengals).
Newton Kulundu, 61, Kenyan politician, Minister of Labour (2006–2008), after long illness.
Sergo Mikoyan, 80, Russian historian, specialist on Latin America, leukemia.
Carlos Moratorio, 80, Argentine Olympic silver medal-winning (1964) equestrian.
Ida Bagus Oka, 74, Indonesian politician, Governor of Bali (1988–1993), heart disease.
Richard Stites, 78, American historian and author, complications from cancer.
Tom Thurber, 75, Canadian politician.
Patrick Topaloff, 65, French actor and humorist, heart attack.
Ben Westlund, 60, American politician, Oregon State Treasurer (2009–2010), lung cancer.
William Proctor Wilson, 88, American businessman and philanthropist.

8
Albert P. Clark, 96, American Air Force officer.
Tony Imi, 72, British cinematographer.
David Kimche, 82, Israeli diplomat, Mossad spy (1953–1980), brain cancer.
Vit Klemes, 77, Czech-born Canadian hydrologist.
Guy Lapébie, 93, French road bicycle racer.
Benjamin Rubin, 93, American microbiologist, inventor of the bifurcated vaccination needle.
Gale Thomson, 90, American First Lady of New Hampshire (1973–1979), wife of Meldrim Thomson, Jr., heart failure.
Mahama Johnson Traoré, 68, Senegalese film director, after long illness.
Georgy Zatsepin, 92, Russian astrophysicist.

9
Antoine Choueiri, 70, Lebanese businessman and media magnate, after long illness.
Paul Collier, 46, Australian disability advocate, brain haemorrhage.
Gheorghe Constantin, 77, Romanian footballer and manager.
Lionel Cox, 80, Australian road bicycle racer, pneumonia.
Willie Davis, 69, American baseball player (Los Angeles Dodgers), natural causes.
Dulmatin, 39, Indonesian terrorist, 2002 Bali bombings planner, shot.
Elizabeth Farrow, 83, American baseball player (AAGPBL).
Teresa Gutiérrez, 81, Colombian actress, natural causes.
Doris Haddock, 100, American political activist, complications of respiratory disease.
Catherine Itzin, 65, American feminist academic, honorary research fellow (University of Bradford), duodenal cancer.
Jean Kerebel, 91, French Olympic silver (1948) medal-winning athlete.
Bernard Narokobi, 67, Papua New Guinean politician, diplomat, lawyer and philosopher, after short illness.
Wilfy Rebimbus, 67, Indian musician, lung cancer.
Alda Neves da Graça do Espírito Santo, 83, Santomean poet.
Ricardo Vidal, 79, Chilean Olympic runner.
Henry Wittenberg, 91, American wrestler, 1948 Olympic gold medalist.

10
Nate Beasley, 56, American football player.
Truddi Chase, 74, American autobiographical author.
Leeann Chin, 77, Chinese-born American restaurateur, founder of Leeann Chin restaurants, after long illness.
Evelyn Dall, 92, American singer and actress, after long illness.
Björn von der Esch, 80, Swedish politician.
Bill Fisher, 84, Australian judge, President of the New South Wales Industrial Commission (1981–1998).
Corey Haim, 38, Canadian actor (Lucas, The Lost Boys, License to Drive), pneumonia.
Tim Holland, 79, American backgammon player, emphysema.
Dorothy Janis, 98, American silent film actress.
Vincent Mensah, 85, Beninese Roman Catholic prelate, Bishop of Porto Novo (1970–2000).
Muhammad Sayyid Tantawy, 81, Egyptian Muslim cleric, Grand Imam (Al-Azhar Mosque), heart attack.
George Webb, 92, British traditional jazz musician

11
Walter Aronsson, 92, Swedish Olympic bobsledder.
Paul Dunlap, 90, American film composer.
John Durr, 79, South African Olympic swimmer.
John Hill, 68, Canadian professional wrestler, Alzheimer's disease.
Louis Holmes, 99, British-born Canadian ice hockey player and coach.
Matilde Elena López, 91, Salvadoran poet, essayist and playwright.
Willie MacFarlane, 79, Scottish footballer and manager.
David Meza, 51, Honduran journalist, shot.
Hans van Mierlo, 78, Dutch politician, Minister of Defence (1981–1982), Minister of Foreign Affairs (1994–1998), Deputy Prime Minister (1994–1998).
Charles Moore, 79, American photographer.
Bernard Novak, 90, American politician, member of the Pennsylvania House of Representatives (1969–1980).
Merlin Olsen, 69, American football player (Los Angeles Rams), member of Pro Football Hall of Fame, and actor (Little House on the Prairie, Father Murphy), mesothelioma.
Arnall Patz, 89, American ophthalmologist, heart disease.
Leena Peltonen-Palotie, 57, Finnish geneticist, bone cancer.
Sandy Scott, 75, Canadian professional wrestler, pancreatic cancer.
Turhan Selçuk, 87, Turkish cartoonist.
Elena Shvarts, 61, Russian poet.
Elisabeth de Stroumillo, 83, British journalist, scooter accident.
Colin Wells, 76, British historian and archaeologist.

12
David Ahenakew, 76, Canadian First Nations leader and politician, cancer.
Moulana Hameed Uddin Husami Aqil Sahab, 77, Indian Islamic scholar.
Bob Attersley, 76, Canadian ice hockey player, 1960 Winter Olympics silver medalist.
Miguel Delibes, 89, Spanish author, journalist and scholar, colorectal cancer.
Lesley Duncan, 66, British singer-songwriter, cerebrovascular disease.
Hanna-Renate Laurien, 81, German politician.
Fatima Meer, 81, South African academic, screenwriter and anti-apartheid activist, stroke.
Aleksandr Minayev, 51, Russian football player and coach.
Charles Muscatine, 89, American Chaucer scholar and advocate for education reform, lung infection.
Hugh Robertson, 70, Scottish footballer (Dundee F.C.).
Hamish Scott, 86, Scottish rugby union player (North of Scotland, national team).
Ian Sinfield, 75, Australian Olympic runner.
*Glauco Villas Boas, 53, Brazilian cartoonist (Geraldão), shot.

13
Jerry Adler, 91, American harmonicist, prostate cancer.
Sir Michael Angus, 79, British businessman, Chairman of Unilever (1986–1992).
Charlie Ashcroft, 83, English footballer (Liverpool F.C.).
Sir Ian Axford, 76, New Zealand space scientist, after long illness.
Jean Ferrat, 79, French singer, cancer.
Momčilo Gavrić, 71, Croatian-born American football player (San Francisco 49ers).
Peter Harburn, 78, English football player (Brighton & Hove Albion).
*He Pingping, 21, Chinese dwarf, shortest man who was able to walk, heart complications.
Terry Heffernan, 58, New Zealand politician, cancer.
Édouard Kargu, 84, French footballer.
Cliff Livingston, 79, American football player (N.Y. Giants) and stuntman, complications from dementia with Lewy bodies and Parkinson's disease.
Leon Manley, 83, Canadian football player (Edmonton Eskimos).
Andrzej Marcinkowski, 81, Polish lawyer and politician, acting Minister of Justice (1991), after long illness.
Neville Meade, 61, Jamaican-born British boxer.
Gary Mittelholtz, 55, Canadian journalist (CBC Radio), heart attack
Fouad Zakariyya, 82/83, Egyptian philosopher.

14
Chimen Abramsky, 93, British historian, expert in Jewish studies and Hebrew literature.
Nahúm Elí Palacios Arteaga, 36, Honduran journalist and television news director, shot.
Hale Ashcraft, 89, American politician.
Marcel Bacou, 74, French football referee.
Carmen Capalbo, 84, American theater director, emphysema.
Edward Eugene Claplanhoo, 81, American Makah leader and veteran, first Makah college graduate, founder of the Makah Museum.
Junior Collins, 82, American horn player.
*Corsica Joe, 90, American professional wrestler.
Cherie DeCastro, 87, American singer (The DeCastro Sisters), pneumonia.
Edmund Dinis, 85, American prosecutor, investigated Chappaquiddick incident, complications of treatment for lymphoma.
Pat Fanning, 91, Irish hurler (Waterford), President of the Gaelic Athletic Association (1970–1973).
Gumersindo Gómez, 81, Argentine Olympic runner.
Peter Graves, 83, American actor (Mission: Impossible, Airplane!, Stalag 17), heart attack.
Vinda Karandikar, 91, Indian poet and writer, after short illness.
Hernán Llerena, 81, Peruvian Olympic cyclist.
Arnold Loxam, 93, British organist.
Konrad Ruhland, 78, German musicologist.
Felipe Sapag, 93, Argentine politician.
Der Scutt, 75, American architect (Trump Tower, One Astor Plaza, Reading Public Museum), liver failure.
Janet Simpson, 65, British Olympic track and field athlete, heart attack.
Altie Taylor, 62, American football player (Detroit Lions).
Lisle Wilson, 66, American actor.

15
W. H. Atkinson, 75, American racing driver.
Emilia Boncodin, 55, Filipino Secretary of DBM (1998, 2001–2005), ZTE scandal whistleblower, cardiac arrest.
Joseph Galdon, 81, Filipino writer and academic.
Günther Heidemann, 77, German Olympic bronze medal-winning (1952) boxer.
Robert Hodgins, 89, South African artist, lung cancer.
Ken Holcombe, 91, American baseball player (Chicago White Sox).
Ashok Kumar, 53, British MP for Langbaurgh (1991–1992) and MSEC (1997–2010), natural causes.
Ron Lundy, 75, American radio disc jockey (WABC, WCBS-FM), heart attack.
Sam Mtukudzi, 21, Zimbabwean musician, car accident.
Patricia Wrightson, 88, Australian children's writer.

16
Abdul Haq Baloch, 63, Pakistani scholar and politician.
Herb Cohen, 77, American record company executive, manager of Frank Zappa.
Billy Hoeft, 77, American Major League Baseball All-Star pitcher (Detroit Tigers, Baltimore Orioles).
Filip Kapisoda, 22, Montenegrin model, suicide by gunshot.
Hachiro Maekawa, 97, Japanese baseball player (Yomiuri Giants), respiratory failure.
Ksenija Pajčin, 32, Serbian pop singer, shot.
Jane Sherman, 101, American writer and dancer.
David J. Steinberg, 45, American actor (Willow, Epic Movie), suicide by hanging.
Elena Tairova, 18, Russian chess player, woman grandmaster and international master, after long illness.
Juan Adolfo Turri, 59, Argentine Olympic athlete.

17
Abdellah Blinda, 58, Moroccan footballer, heart attack.
Tim Chadwick, 47, New Zealand artist, traffic collision.
Alex Chilton, 59, American musician (Big Star, The Box Tops), heart attack.
Wayne Collett, 60, American athlete, 1972 Summer Olympics silver medalist, cancer.
Sid Fleischman, 90, American children's writer, cancer.
Van Fletcher, 85, American baseball player (Detroit Tigers).
Charlie Gillett, 68, British radio presenter, music writer and record producer, after long illness.
Peter Gowland, 93, American glamour photographer and actor, hip surgery.
Ștefan Gheorghiu, 83, Romanian violinist.
Johnnie High, 80, American country music impresario, heart failure.
*Pak Nam-gi, 76, North Korean public official, executed by firing squad.
Robert Michael White, 85, American X-15 test pilot.

18
Amanda Castro, 47, Honduran poet, respiratory disease.
Julinho, 90, Portuguese footballer.
Herb Denenberg, 80, American journalist (WCAU), consumer advocate, Pennsylvania insurance commissioner, heart attack.
Donald P. Kelly, 88, American leveraged buyout investor (Beatrice Foods), cancer.
Chick Lang, Sr., 83, American businessman, general manager of Maryland Jockey Club, natural causes.
Herbert G. Lewin, 95, American politician, candidate in the 1988 Presidential election, heart failure.
Fess Parker, 85, American actor (Davy Crockett, Daniel Boone), natural causes.
Zygmunt Pawłowicz, 82, Polish Roman Catholic prelate, Auxiliary Bishop of Gdańsk (1985–2005).
Paul Warner Powell, 31, American convicted murderer, executed by electric chair.
William Wolfe, 86, Scottish politician, National Chairman of the Scottish National Party (1969–1979).
Konstantin Yeryomenko, 39, Russian futsal player, European champion (1999), heart attack.
Jerry York, 71, American businessman, executive director of Apple Inc., cerebral hemorrhage.

19
Carlo Chenis, 55, Italian Roman Catholic prelate, Bishop of Civitavecchia-Tarquinia (since 2006).
Bob Curtis, 60, English footballer (Charlton Athletic, Mansfield Town), motor neurone disease.
Gerald Drucker, 84, British double bass player.
Wayne S. Ewing, 81, American politician.
John Hicklenton, 42, British comics artist (2000 AD), assisted suicide.
Ted Hooper, 91, British beekeeper.
George Lane, 95, Hungarian-born British World War II commando, pneumonia.
Roberto de la Madrid, 88, Mexican politician, Governor of Baja California (1977–1983), first American-born governor of a Mexican state.
Bill McIntyre, 80, American actor (Dallas), natural causes.
Elinor Smith, 98, American aviator.
Dottie Thompson, 88, American festival organizer, co-founder of the Merrie Monarch Festival, complications from pneumonia.
Raúl de la Torre, 72, Argentine film director (Pobre mariposa, Funes, un gran amor), cardiac arrest.

20
Susanna Amatuni, 86, Soviet Armenian art critic and musicologist.
István Bilek, 77, Hungarian chess grandmaster.
Alan Cameron, 80, Australian rugby union player, national team.
Harry Carpenter, 84, British sports commentator and television presenter.
Liz Carpenter, 89, American feminist author, press secretary to Lady Bird Johnson (1963–1969), pneumonia.
Claiborne Cary, 78, American actress and cabaret performer, complications from Parkinson's disease.
Clodomiro Castilla, 50, Colombian journalist, shot. 
Dorothy Corrigan, 96, Canadian politician, first female Mayor of Charlottetown (1968–1972).
Chicka Dixon, 81, Australian Aboriginal activist, asbestosis.
Ebet Kadarusman, 73, Indonesian television and radio presenter, stroke.
Ray Fonseca, 56, American hula master, heart attack.
Fred Heineman, 80, American politician, Representative from North Carolina (1995–1997), natural causes.
John Eric Holmes, 80, American science fiction and fantasy author.
Girija Prasad Koirala, 85, Nepalese politician, Prime Minister (four terms), multiple organ dysfunction syndrome.
Ian Knight, 69, British stage designer, cancer.
Rihards Kotāns, 54, Latvian Olympic bobsledder.
Naim Kryeziu, 92, Albanian footballer.
Erwin Lehn, 90, German musician and conductor.
Robin Milner, 76, British computer scientist, heart attack.
Ai Ogawa, 62, American poet, breast cancer.
Otto Otepka, 94, American Deputy Director of the Department of State's Office of Security (1959–1962).
Fernando Iório Rodrigues, 80, Brazilian Roman Catholic prelate, Bishop of Palmeira dos Índios (1985–2006).
Mikel Scicluna, 80, Canadian professional wrestler, liver cancer.
Stewart Udall, 90, American politician, Secretary of the Interior (1961–1969), fall.
*Yang Lina, 47, Singaporean actress (Samsui Women), uterine cancer.

21
Vivian Blake, 53, Jamaican drug lord, heart attack.
Franco Gualdrini, 86, Italian Roman Catholic prelate, Bishop of Terni-Narni-Amelia (1983–2000).
Lou Jankowski, 78, Canadian ice hockey player (Chicago Blackhawks, Detroit Red Wings).
Takeo Kimura, 91, Japanese art director.
Brownie Ledbetter, 77, American civil rights activist.
Margaret Moth, 58, New Zealand photojournalist (CNN), colorectal cancer.
Wolfgang Wagner, 90, German director (Bayreuth Festival), natural causes.
Susana, Lady Walton, 83, Argentine writer, widow of composer Sir William Walton, natural causes.

22
Sir James Black, 85, British physician, Nobel Laureate in Medicine (1988).
Özhan Canaydın, 67, Turkish basketball player, president of Galatasaray S.K. (2002–2008), pancreatic cancer.
Diz Disley, 78, Canadian-born British jazz guitarist.
Ky Fan, 95, American mathematician.
Ella Mae Johnson, 106, American social worker and author.
Leroy Matthiesen, 88, American Roman Catholic prelate, Bishop of Amarillo (1980–1997).
Emil Schulz, 71, German boxer.
Valentina Tolkunova, 63, Russian singer, People's Artist of RSFSR, brain tumor.

23
Bob Abbott, 77, American judge.
Nail Bakirov, 57, Russian statistician, car accident.
Edith Barney, 87, American baseball player.
Midge Costanza, 77, American social and political activist, advisor to President Jimmy Carter, cancer.
Alan King-Hamilton, 105, British judge.
Lauretta Masiero, 82, Italian actress, Alzheimer's disease.
Jiro Nagasawa, 78, Japanese Olympic swimmer and national coach, throat cancer.
Wayne Patrick, 63, American football player (Buffalo Bills), kidney disease.
Kaljo Põllu, 75, Estonian artist.
Kanu Sanyal, 78, Indian revolutionary, Naxal leader, suicide by hanging.
Alex Seith, 75, American politician.
*Sulaiman Daud, 77, Malaysian politician, minister (1981–1999), liver cancer.
Blanche Thebom, 94, American mezzo-soprano, pneumonia.
Fritz Wagnerberger, 72, German Olympic skier.
James Williamson, 26, Australian mountain biker and journalist.
Marva Wright, 62, American blues singer, complications from a stroke.

24
Elijah Alexander, 39, American football player (Indianapolis Colts), multiple myeloma.
Anzor Astemirov, 33, Russian insurgent, leader of the 2005 Nalchik raid, shot.
Robert Culp, 79, American actor (I Spy, The Greatest American Hero, The Pelican Brief), heart attack.
Martin Elliott, 63, British photographer (Tennis Girl), cancer.
Oswaldo Frota-Pessoa, 93, Brazilian geneticist and academic.
Ron Hamence, 94, Australian cricketer.
Colleen Kay Hutchins, 83, American actress, Miss America (1952), mother of Kiki Vandeweghe.
Jim Marshall, 74, American photographer.
William Mayne, 82, British children's author.
Harold McGraw, Jr., 92, American businessman, CEO of McGraw-Hill (1975–1983).
Daphne Park, Baroness Park of Monmouth, 88, British spy (MI6), after long illness.
Mortimer Sackler, 93, American physician and philanthropist.
Eric Sunderland, 80, Welsh anthropologist and academic administrator, Vice Chancellor of Bangor University (1984–1995).

25
Alberto Arroyo, 94, American runner.
Pål Bang-Hansen, 72, Norwegian film director, actor and film critic, skin cancer.
Ben Gascoigne, 94, New Zealand-born Australian optical astronomer.
Kit Horn, 80, American surfer, non-Hodgkin's lymphoma.
Des Hoysted, 87, Australian radio broadcaster and horse racing commentator.
Marty Lederhandler, 92, American photographer (Associated Press), stroke.
John P. McGarr, 45, American actor and film producer, traffic accident.
Elisabeth Noelle-Neumann, 93, German political scientist.
*José Antonio Peteiro Freire, 73, Moroccan Roman Catholic prelate, archbishop of Tanger (1983–2005).
Marshall Plummer, 62, American first Vice President of the Navajo Nation (1991–1994), lung disease.
Martin Řehák, 76, Czech Olympic athlete.
Michael S. Rosenfeld, 75, American talent agent, co-founder of Creative Artists Agency.
Robert Sandager, 95, American Olympic shooter.
Chet Simmons, 81, American sports broadcasting executive, first president of ESPN, Commissioner (USFL), natural causes.
Václav Syrový, 75, Czech Olympic weightlifter.
*Zainal Abidin Ahmad, 71, Malaysian politician, brain cancer.
Zhang Tingfa, 91, Chinese general, commander of the PLA Air Force.
Kyohei Ushio, 75, Japanese Olympic sprinter.

26
*Ahmed bin Zayed Al Nahyan, 41, Emirati managing director of the Abu Dhabi Investment Authority, glider crash.
Abeywardena Balasuriya, 63, Sri Lankan musician, playback singer, writer and a television program producer.
Frank Burgess, 75, American federal judge and basketball player, cancer.
Lara Jones, 34, British children's author and illustrator, melanoma.
Manuel de Jesús Juárez, 55, Honduran journalist, shot.
Shmuel Katz, 83, Israeli caricaturist and illustrator.
Ruy Kopper, 79, Brazilian Olympic rower.
Kwon Hyi-ro, 81, Japanese-born Korean murderer, prostate cancer.
Heinz Laufer, 84, German Olympic athlete.
*José Bayardo Mairena Ramírez, 52, Honduran journalist, shot.
Rocco Pantaleo, 53, Italian-born Australian owner of La Porchetta, motorcycle accident.
Charles Ryskamp, 81, American art collector and museum director (Frick Collection, Pierpont Morgan Library), cancer.
George X. Schwartz, 96, American politician.
Max Whitehead, 87, Australian rugby league player, model and professional wrestler, complications following a hip operation.

27
Dick Giordano, 77, American comic book artist and editor (Batman, Wonder Woman, Thor), complications from pneumonia.
Zbigniew Gut, 60, Polish footballer.
Peter Herbolzheimer, 74, German jazz musician.
Stephen Hearst, 90, Austrian-born British television and radio executive.
Colm Kiernan, 78, Australian historian, biographer of Irish Australians.
Eva Markvoort, 25, Canadian blogger and subject of 65_Redroses, cystic fibrosis.
Stanford Parris, 80, American politician, Representative from Virginia (1973–1975, 1981–1991), heart disease.
Vasily Smyslov, 89, Russian chess grandmaster, World Champion (1957–1958), heart failure.
Stanley Vann, 100, British organist and composer, complications following a fall.

28
Fred Ascani, 92, American Air Force test pilot, lung cancer.
David Carnegie, 14th Earl of Northesk, 55, Scottish peer, member of the House of Lords.
Preeda Chullamondhol, 64, Thai Olympic cyclist.
Sir Gaven Donne, 95, New Zealand jurist, former Chief Justice of various Pacific nations.
Dan Duncan, 77, American businessman oil company executive and billionaire, cerebral hemorrhage.
Herb Ellis, 88, American jazz guitarist, Alzheimer's disease.
Derlis Florentín, 26, Paraguayan football player, car accident.
Joe Gates, 55, American baseball player (Chicago White Sox) and coach (Gary SouthShore RailCats), heart failure.
June Havoc, 97, Canadian-born American actress, natural causes.
Ali Ibrahim, 38, Egyptian Olympic rower, traffic collision.
Johnny Lawrenson, 88, British rugby league player.
John Purdin, 67, American baseball player.
Agim Qirjaqi, 59, Albanian actor and television director.
Zofia Romanowicz, 87, Polish writer and translator.
Asbjørn Sjøthun, 82, Norwegian politician, Mayor of Balsfjord (1962–1969), MP (1969–1989).
Eric Tunney, 45, Canadian comedian (Kids in the Hall: Brain Candy).

29
Tom Burton, 46, American professional wrestler.
*Choi Jin-young, 39, South Korean actor and singer, brother of Choi Jin-sil, suicide by hanging.
Jean Cosmat, 99, French Olympic bronze medal-winning (1936) rower.
Kurt Hockerup, 65, Danish politician, cardiac arrest.
Alan Isler, 75, British-born American novelist and professor, after long illness.
János Kass, 82, Hungarian artist.
Jenne Langhout, 91, Dutch Olympic field hockey player.
Sam Menning, 85, American actor (The Prestige), emphysema.
Armando Nogueira, 83, Brazilian sports journalist.
Elliot Willensky, 66, American songwriter, stroke.

30
Franklin DeWayne Alix, 34, American serial killer, execution by lethal injection.
Alfred Ambs, 87, German World War II flying ace.
Thomas Angove, 92, Australian winemaker, inventor of the wine cask.
Laszlo Antal, 73, Hungarian born English sport shooter.
Nicola Arigliano, 86, Italian jazz singer, musician, and actor.
John Bunch, 88, American jazz pianist, melanoma.
Juan Carlos Caballero Vega, 109, Mexican revolutionary, driver of Pancho Villa.
Jaime Escalante, 79, American mathematics teacher, inspiration for film Stand and Deliver, bladder cancer.
John Fethers, 80, Australian Olympic fencer (1952).
Peter Flinsch, 89, German-born Canadian artist.
Josef Homeyer, 80, German Roman Catholic prelate, bishop of Hildesheim (1983–2004).
Morris R. Jeppson, 87, American Army Air Corps officer, assistant weaponeer on the Enola Gay.
David Mills, 48, American author, journalist and television writer (NYPD Blue, ER, The Wire), brain aneurysm.
Malcolm Poindexter, 84, American journalist and reporter (KYW-TV), Alzheimer's disease.
Martin Sandberger, 98, German Nazi leader and Holocaust perpetrator.
Harriet Shetler, 92, American journalist and advocate, a founder of the National Alliance on Mental Illness.
William T. Smith, 94, American politician, Member of the New York Senate (1963–1987).
H. Clyde Wilson Jr., 83, American anthropologist and politician.
Jadin Wong, 96, American dancer, comedian and talent agent.

31
Eugene Allen, 90, American White House butler (1952–1986), renal failure.
Marcelle Arnold, 92, French actress.
Arlette Franco, 70, French politician, complications from brain tumor.
Burton Joseph, 79, American First Amendment lawyer, brain cancer.
Tina Leung, 65, Hong Kong actress.
Ludwig Martin, 100, German lawyer, Attorney General of Germany (1963–1974).
Shirley Mills, 83, American actress (The Grapes of Wrath), pneumonia.
Jerald terHorst, 87, American White House Press Secretary (1974), heart failure.
Qasim Mahmood, 81, Pakistani intellectual and foremost encyclopedist, heart failure.

References

2010-03
 03